Sarcophyton is a genus of corals in the family Alcyoniidae that are commonly kept in reef aquaria.

Species
The following species currently are classified in the genus Sarcophyton: 

Sarcophyton aalbersbergi Feussner & Waqa, 2013
Sarcophyton acutangulum (v. Marenzeller, 1886)
Sarcophyton acutum Tixier-Durivault, 1970
Sarcophyton agaricum (Stimpson, 1855)
Sarcophyton aldersladei Feussner & Waqa, 2013
Sarcophyton alexanderi Feussner & Waqa, 2013
Sarcophyton auritum Verseveldt & Benayahu, 1978
Sarcophyton birkelandi Verseveldt, 1978
Sarcophyton boettgeri Schenk, 1896
Sarcophyton boletiforme Tixier-Durivault, 1958
Sarcophyton buitendijki Verseveldt, 1982
Sarcophyton cherbonnieri Tixier-Durivault, 1958
Sarcophyton cinereum Tixier-Durivault, 1946
Sarcophyton contortum Pratt, 1905
Sarcophyton cornispiculatum Verseveldt, 1971
Sarcophyton crassocaule Moser, 1919
Sarcophyton crassum Tixier-Durivault, 1946
Sarcophyton digitatum Moser, 1919
Sarcophyton ehrenbergi (v. Marenzeller, 1886)
Sarcophyton elegans Moser, 1919
Sarcophyton expandum Kõlliker
Sarcophyton flexuosum Tixier-Durivault, 1966
Sarcophyton furcatum Li, 1984
Sarcophyton gemmatum Verseveldt & Benayahu, 1978
Sarcophyton glaucum (Quoy & Gaimard, 1833)
Sarcophyton griffini Moser, 1919
Sarcophyton infundibuliforme Tixier-Durivault, 1958
Sarcophyton latum (Dana, 1846)
Sarcophyton mililatensis Verseveldt & Tursch, 1979
Sarcophyton minusculum Samimi Namin & van Ofwegen, 2009
Sarcophyton nanwanensis Benayahu & Perkol-Finkel, 2004
Sarcophyton nigrum May, 1899
Sarcophyton pauciplicatum Verseveldt & Benayahu, 1978
Sarcophyton portentosum Tixier-Durivault, 1970
Sarcophyton pulchellum (Tixier-Durivault, 1957)
Sarcophyton regulare Tixier-Durivault, 1946
Sarcophyton roseum Pratt, 1903
Sarcophyton serenei Tixier-Durivault, 1958
Sarcophyton skeltoni Feussner & Waqa, 2013
Sarcophyton soapiae Feussner & Waqa, 2013
Sarcophyton solidum Tixier-Durivault, 1958
Sarcophyton spinospiculatum Alderslade & Shirwaiker, 1991
Sarcophyton spongiosum Thomson & Dean, 1931
Sarcophyton stellatum Kükenthal, 1910
Sarcophyton stolidotum Verseveldt, 1971
Sarcophyton subviride Tixier-Durivault, 1958
Sarcophyton tenuispiculatum (Thomson & Dean, 1931)
Sarcophyton tortuosum Tixier-Durivault, 1946
Sarcophyton trocheliophorum von Marenzeller, 1886
Sarcophyton tumulosum Benayahu & van Ofwegen, 2009
Sarcophyton turschi Verseveldt, 1976

References

Alcyoniidae
Octocorallia genera